Andrea Fernanda "Ea" Tovar de la Peña (born 22 August 1990) is a Venezuelan footballer who plays as a goalkeeper for the Venezuela women's national team.

Awards
Venezuelan Women's Cup 2008-09 
Venezuelan Women's Cup 2009-10 
Venezuelan Women's Cup 2010-11 
Venezuelan Women's Cup 2011-12

References

 Andrea Tovar es el muro de la portería roja
 Andrea Tovar deja al Caracas FC para incursionar en el fútbol brasileño
 Andrea Tovar lleva sus guantes a brasil
Plantilla Alavés Gloriosas

External links
Andrea Fernanda Tovar at Futboleras.es (in Spanish)

1990 births
Living people
Footballers from Caracas
Venezuelan women's footballers
Women's association football goalkeepers
São José Esporte Clube (women) players
Venezuela women's international footballers
Venezuelan expatriate women's footballers
Venezuelan expatriate sportspeople in Brazil
Expatriate women's footballers in Brazil
Venezuelan expatriate sportspeople in Colombia
Expatriate women's footballers in Colombia
Venezuelan expatriate sportspeople in Spain
Expatriate women's footballers in Spain
Venezuelan expatriate sportspeople in Cyprus
Expatriate women's footballers in Cyprus